Following the start of the Malleson Mission, the British army in the area feared a Bolshevik attack on local forces. On the 11 August, two machine guns of the 19th Punjabis left Muhammadabad and crossed the border to Artik to assist local forces in case of a new Bolshevik attack.

The attack came the next day on the 12th of August, with the Bolsheviks mustering a force around 3,000. The Transcaspian force however, numbered round 1,000 men. They were quickly overrun by the Bolshevik army and the entire British mission in the area was put at risk. However, the usage of machine guns by the Indian detachment prevented complete disaster, as per the official account.

.
Despite avoiding disaster, the force was forced to retreat to Dushak, while the machine gun detachment returned home due to disease and casualties.

References

Russian Civil War
British India
Bolsheviks